Philippe Dupuy (born 12 December 1960, Sainte-Adresse) and Charles Berbérian (born 28 May 1959, Baghdad) are French cartoonists most famous for their series of Franco-Belgian comics albums featuring the character Monsieur Jean.

Their collaboration is notable as they share every aspect of creating their stories, from plot through layouts, pencils and inks, to the extent that it is impossible to detect who is responsible for what. But in 2003, they decided to again work on their own, and have since published solo material like Hanté by Dupuy in 2005.

Bibliography 
 Le Petit Peintre (Magic Strip, 1985)
 Chantal Thomas (Michel Lagarde, 1987)
 Les Héros ne Meurent Jamais (L'Association, 1991)
 Le Monde est Fou (À Suivre, 1997) — based on a script by Vincent Ravalec
 Monsieur Jean 4: Vivons heureux sans avoir l'air (1999)
 The Complete Universe of Dupuy-Berberian (Oog en Blik, 2006)

Awards
 1989: Award for First Comic Book at the Angoulême International Comics Festival, France
 1999: Award for Best French Comic Book at the Angoulême International Comics Festival
 2003: Inkpot Award, United States
 2006: nominated for Best Comic book at the Angoulême International Comics Festival (Philippe Dupuy only)
 2008: Grand Prix de la ville d'Angoulême

References 

Philippe Dupuy at Lambiek.net
Charles Berberian at Lambiek.net

External links

Berberian and Dupuy's drawings on the 2009 French Open
  An article by Guillaume Paugam "Dupuy, Berberian - Le trait", published in the journal Labyrinthe #25 "La bande dessinée : ce qu'elle dit, ce qu'elle montre", 2006.

Art duos
French cartoonists
Grand Prix de la ville d'Angoulême winners
École nationale supérieure des arts décoratifs alumni
Inkpot Award winners